Malaga Township is one of the eighteen townships of Monroe County, Ohio, United States. As of the 2010 census, the population was 1,062.

Geography
Located in the northern part of the county, it borders the following townships:
Somerset Township, Belmont County - north
Wayne Township, Belmont County - northeast
Sunsbury Township - east
Center Township - southeast
Summit Township - southwest
Seneca Township - west

Two villages are located in Malaga Township: Miltonsburg in the center, and part of Jerusalem in the northeast.  As well, the unincorporated community of Malaga lies in the northern part of the township.

Name and history
It is the only Malaga Township statewide.
A Key founder of Malaga Township was John Hendershot born in 1764 in Sussex County, New Jersey. He had three sons between 1788 and 1797. John enlisted in the Pennsylvania Militia, Bedford County Rangers of Frontiers, under Captain William McCall. In 1782 after the Revolutionary War, he moved to Washington County, Pennsylvania (now Greene County) and then he moved to Monroe County, Ohio, and built a cabin in Malaga Township before 1815. He mapped the town out. The first settlers of Magala Township were the families of John, Stillwell Truax, Mathew Rogers, Martin Fogle, Frederick Hayes, Peter MAnn, David Mann, William Kennard, James Graham and David Lupton. This was before 1815. The first election in Magala Township was held at the home of Peter Mann in 1820. There were 22 Votes cast, among them were the names of John and Jonathon Hendershot.

Source Genealogy of the Hendershot Family in America by Alfred E. Hendershot 1961.

Government
The township is governed by a three-member board of trustees, who are elected in November of odd-numbered years to a four-year term beginning on the following January 1. Two are elected in the year after the presidential election and one is elected in the year before it. There is also an elected township fiscal officer, who serves a four-year term beginning on April 1 of the year after the election, which is held in November of the year before the presidential election. Vacancies in the fiscal officership or on the board of trustees are filled by the remaining trustees.

References

External links
County website

Townships in Monroe County, Ohio
Townships in Ohio